The  Mahbere Dego massacres were mass extrajudicial killings that took place in Mahbere Dego in the Tigray Region of Ethiopia during the Tigray War, on 16-18 January 2021. Mahbere Dego is a small town that belongs to woreda Na’ider, Central zone of Tigray.

Massacre
The Ethiopian National Defense Force (ENDF) killed dozens of civilians in Mahbere Dego (Central Tigray). Videos of the massacres are not time stamped; the massacres are believed to have started on 15 January 2021 and continued for several days. The massacres occurred in a similar way as many massacres in the Tigray War. The ENDF targeted civilians, especially male, in this case merchants, farmers, often brothers or father and son. They filmed the killings, and, exceptionally, a whistleblower transmitted the videos to Tigrai Media House. Dozens of unarmed civilian men were grouped in the wilderness outside of the town, driven to a cliff edge and executed by the Ethiopian soldiers. Thanks to the particular geomorphology of the surroundings, the imagery could be geolocated.
After factchecking the footage of the massacres was published by CNN and BBC.

Typical massacres committed by Ethiopian and Eritrean soldiers in the Tigray war are (1) revenge when they lose a battle; (2) to terrorise and extract information about whereabouts of TPLF leaders; (3) murder of suspected family members of TDF fighters; and (4) terrorising the Tigray society as a whole.

Perpetrators
Relatives, investigators and international media interpreted the identity of the perpetrators as Ethiopian soldiers.

Victims
The BBC mentions 73 victims, and the “Tigray: Atlas of the humanitarian situation” approximately 50 victims; 54 victims have been identified. 

Relatives could only access the crime site on 19 June 2021. Only some bones, ID cards and pieces of clothes were recovered. On 20 June the remains were buried in a funeral ceremony.

Reactions
The Mahbere Dego massacres became world news, evidencing what is ongoing in Tigray. As a consequence, the Ethiopian embassy in London issued a “Statement on the Alleged Massacre in Mahbere Dego, Tigray”:

After months of denial by the Ethiopian authorities that massacres occurred in Tigray, a joint investigation by OHCHR and the Ethiopian Human Rights Commission was announced in March 2021.

The “Tigray: Atlas of the humanitarian situation”, that documented this massacre received international media attention, particularly regarding its Annex A, that lists massacres in the Tigray War.

On 16 June 2021, Tigrai Media House broadcast additional footage of the massacre, showing that a female Amhara soldier was among the killers. Bellingcat confirmed that the video shows the same massacre as the earlier videos.

References

External links
World Peace Foundation: Starving Tigray

January 2021 crimes in Africa
2021 massacres of the Tigray War
Filmed killings